Vaxell Sp. z o.o. is a Polish aircraft engine manufacturer based in Bydgoszcz. The company specializes in the design and manufacture of engines for ultralight and homebuilt aircraft.

The company is a Spółka z ograniczoną odpowiedzialnością, a Polish limited liability company.

In the mid-2000s the company developed a range of four-cylinder, air-cooled, four-stroke, horizontally opposed engines, including the  Vaxell 60i, the  Vaxell 80i and the  Vaxell 100i.

Aircraft engines
Summary of engines built by Vaxell:
Vaxell 60i
Vaxell 80i
Vaxell 100i

References

External links

Aircraft engine manufacturers of Poland